Born Under Saturn is the second studio album by British art rock band Django Django. It reached number 15 on the UK Albums Chart in May 2015.

Reception

Born Under Saturn received positive reviews from critics. On Metacritic, the album holds a score of 72/100 based on 21 reviews, indicating "generally favorable reviews".

Accolades

Track listing
 "Giant" – 5:54
 "Shake & Tremble" – 4:19
 "Found You" – 4:43
 "First Light" – 4:50
 "Pause Repeat" – 3:29
 "Reflections" – 4:20
 "Vibrations" – 3:08
 "Shot Down" – 5.09
 "High Moon" – 4:43
 "Beginning to Fade" – 3:16
 "4000 Years" – 4:17
 "Break the Glass" – 4:30
 "Life We Know" – 3.24

Tour
The band toured the album through Europe and North America, from May 2015 until September 2015.

References

2015 albums
Django Django albums
Because Music albums